Terry Wells (born September 10, 1963), is an American former Major League Baseball (MLB) pitcher who played for the Los Angeles Dodgers in 1990.

Biography
A native of Kankakee, Illinois, Wells attended the University of Illinois at Urbana–Champaign, and in 1984 he played collegiate summer baseball with the Harwich Mariners of the Cape Cod Baseball League.

Wells was drafted by the Houston Astros in the 8th round of the 1985 Major League Baseball Draft.  He had been drafted twice before (by the Cleveland Indians in 1981 and Chicago White Sox in 1984) but did not sign a contract on either occasion.

Wells was best known for being traded on April 1, 1990, by the Astros to the Los Angeles Dodgers for Franklin Stubbs, who had been a member of the Dodgers 1988 World Series team.  The trade took place just days prior to the start of the season.

That year, 1990, was the only season in which Wells appeared.  He started 5 games for the Dodgers, compiling a 1–2 won-loss record with a high 7.84 earned run average.  He was released at the conclusion of the 1990 season and did not sign with another Major League team.

References

External links

Retrosheet
The Baseball Gauge
Venezuela Winter League

1963 births
Living people
African-American baseball players
Albuquerque Dukes players
Asheville Tourists players
Auburn Astros players
Baseball players from Illinois
Charlotte Knights players
Colorado Springs Sky Sox players
Columbus Astros players
Columbus Mudcats players
Harwich Mariners players
Illinois Fighting Illini baseball players
Leones del Caracas players
American expatriate baseball players in Venezuela
Los Angeles Dodgers players
Major League Baseball pitchers
Oklahoma City 89ers players
Osceola Astros players
Sportspeople from Kankakee, Illinois
Tucson Toros players
University of Illinois Urbana-Champaign alumni
21st-century African-American people
20th-century African-American sportspeople